The 1984 Brabantse Pijl was the 24th edition of the Brabantse Pijl cycle race and was held on 25 March 1984. The race started in Sint-Genesius-Rode and finished in Alsemberg. The race was won by Ronny Van Holen.

General classification

References

1984
Brabantse Pijl